Valayal Satham is a 1987 Indian Tamil-language film directed by Jeevabalan and produced by K. R. Prakash. The film stars Murali, Bhagyalakshmi, Raja and Madhuri.

Cast

Murali
Bhagyalakshmi (Credited as Bhagya)
Raja
Madhuri
M. N. Nambiar
M. N. Rajam
Manorama
Janagaraj
Senthil
Anuja
Bindugosh
S. R. Vijaya
Sri Gowri
Shyamalakumari
Chinni Jayanth
M. S. K. Kumaran
Pattukottai Bhaskar
K. Renga Ramanujam
Master Sathish
Master Aravind
Pasi Narayanan
Vellai Subbaiah
Kumarimuthu
M. L. A. Thangaraj
Kullamani
Pakkirisamy
Nellai Sarathy
Periya Karuppa Devar
Jothi Kathirvel
Lagiyam Ramadurai

Soundtrack 
Lyrics: Valee

Play back singers: KJ Yesudas, Malaysia Vasudevan, S. Janaki, KS Chitra, Sadhan

Reception
The Indian Express wrote the film "takes refuge in cliches normal to the general run of Tamil films".

References

1987 films
Films scored by M. S. Viswanathan
1980s Tamil-language films